Nils Olof Wallin (May 4, 1904 – March 8, 1987) was a Swedish canoeist who competed in the 1936 Summer Olympics.

He was born and died in Västervik.

In 1936 he finished ninth in the K-1 10000 m event.

References
Sports-reference.com profile

1904 births
1987 deaths
Canoeists at the 1936 Summer Olympics
Olympic canoeists of Sweden
Swedish male canoeists
People from Västervik Municipality
Sportspeople from Kalmar County